Bartolini is an Italian surname. Notable people with the surname include:

Andrea Bartolini (born 1968), Italian motocross driver
Elio Bartolini (1922–2006), Italian writer
Enzo Bartolini (1914–1998), Italian rower
Gioseffo Maria Bartolini (1657–1725), Italian painter  
Lorenzo Bartolini (1777–1850), Italian sculptor
Luigi Bartolini (1892–1963), Italian writer
Massimo Bartolini (born 1962), Italian artist
Orfeo Bartolini (1952–2003), Italian murdered in Afghanistan
Simone Bartolini, Italian singer
Sebastián Bartolini (born 1982), Argentine footballer

See also
12399 Bartolini, an asteroid
Bartolini Pickups and Electronics, American manufacturer

Italian-language surnames
Patronymic surnames
Surnames from given names